533 Statements is a 2006 Canadian documentary film directed by Tori Foster. The film features Foster travelling across Canada to interview various lesbian and transgender women in cities and towns across the country.

The film premiered at the 2006 Inside Out Film and Video Festival, where it was co-winner with Denis Langlois's film Amnesia: The James Brighton Enigma of the award for Best Canadian Feature Film.

References

2006 films
Canadian documentary films
Canadian LGBT-related films
Documentary films about lesbians
2006 LGBT-related films
2006 documentary films
2000s English-language films
2000s Canadian films